Jaineeraj Rajpurohit is an Indian actor who appears in Hindi television serials and films. He is known for acting in the television shows like Balika Vadhu as Alok Shekhar on Colors TV, Naagin as Ranveer on Colors TV, Saas Bina Sasural 2, Laagi Tujhse Lagan, Miley Jab Hum Tum and he also did a character role in the Bollywood film OMG – Oh My God!

Filmography

Television

References

External links

Living people
21st-century Indian male actors
Year of birth missing (living people)